Lucas da Silva Carvalho (born 16 July 1993) is a Brazilian sprinter specialising in the 400 metres. He represented his country at the 2017 World Championships without qualifying for the semifinals. He was also an unused reserve runner for the Brazilian 4 × 400 metres relay at the 2016 Summer Olympics. He competed at the 2020 Summer Olympics.

His personal best in the event is 45.37 seconds set in São Bernardo do Campo in 2017. Earlier in his career he competed in the 110 metres hurdles and the decathlon.

Personal bests
200 m: 20.40 (wind: +1.2 m/s) –  São Paulo, 13 Dec 2020
400 m: 45.37 –  São Bernardo do Campo, 15 Jul 2017

All information from World Athletics profile.

International competitions

References

1993 births
Living people
Brazilian male sprinters
World Athletics Championships athletes for Brazil
Athletes (track and field) at the 2018 South American Games
South American Games gold medalists for Brazil
South American Games bronze medalists for Brazil
South American Games medalists in athletics
Ibero-American Championships in Athletics winners
South American Games gold medalists in athletics
Troféu Brasil de Atletismo winners
Athletes (track and field) at the 2020 Summer Olympics
Olympic athletes of Brazil
People from Santo André, São Paulo
Sportspeople from São Paulo (state)
21st-century Brazilian people